The Gwinnett Justice and Administration Center (also called the Gwinnett County Courthouse or GJAC) is a courthouse and administrative center for Gwinnett County, Georgia located in the county seat of Lawrenceville, Georgia.

History
The Gwinnett Justice and Administration Center was built in 1988 at a cost of $72 million to replace the original Gwinnett County Courthouse, which had been built in 1872 shortly after the American Civil War.

The facility was designed by architecture firms Richardson, Inc. from Dallas, Texas, and Architects Plus from Norcross, Georgia.

In 2021 the Gwinnett County Board of Commissioners approved a $34 million renovation to the Gwinnett Justice and Administration Center and the nearby One Justice Square building. The One Justice Square building is one block away from the GJAC and contains office spaces for the Gwinnett County Department of Planning and Development

Facility
The facility, also known as the Gwinnett County Courthouse, is located at 75 Langley Drive in Lawrenceville. The facility consists of 27 courtrooms, offices for various departments of the Gwinnett County government, and a law library.

In 2019 a  parking deck was added which has 1,450 parking spaces.

Expansion

A $75 million expansion project in 2020 included the construction of a new five-story,  courthouse building called the Charolotte J. Nash Court Building. The Nash building was designed by the architecture firms Pieper O'Brien Herr Architects and DLR Group. The Nash building is connected to the original GJAC building via an enclosed pedestrian bridge. The courthouse expansion was named after Charlotte J. Nash, a retired chairwoman for the Gwinnett County Board of Commissioners.

References

External links

Buildings and structures in Georgia (U.S. state)